Jason Lowe may refer to:
 Jason Lowe (footballer), English footballer
 Jason Lowe (darts player), English darts player 
 Jason Lowe (politician), member of the Oklahoma House of Representatives